The 2018 Jiffy Lube Alberta Scotties Tournament of Hearts, the provincial women's curling championship for Alberta, was held January 10–14 at the Medicine Hat Curling Club in Medicine Hat, Alberta. The winning Casey Scheidegger rink represented Alberta at the 2018 Scotties Tournament of Hearts.

Qualification Process
Source:

Teams
The teams are listed as follows:

Knockout brackets

A Event

B Event

C Event

Playoffs

A vs B
Saturday, January 13, 6:30pm

C1 vs C2
Saturday, January 13, 6:30pm

Semifinal
Sunday, January 14, 10:30am

Final
Sunday, January 14, 4:30 pm

References

External links
Official website

Saskatchewan Scotties Tournament of Hearts
2018 in Alberta
January 2018 sports events in Canada
Curling in Alberta
Sport in Medicine Hat